Daughters of the Night is a 1924 American silent melodrama film produced and distributed by the Fox Film Corporation. It was directed by Elmer Clifton with Alyce Mills as the lead actress.

Plot
As described in a review in a film magazine, Betty Blair (Mills) finishes a training course at the school for telephone operators in New York and returns to her home town Midvale where her scheming aunt (Chapin) makes her promise to marry a scheming wealthy lawyer, Kilmaster (Richmond). Brothers Jimmy (Sands) and Billy Roberts (Caldwell) cap the climax to a wild career by getting arrested in a street brawl and are turned out by their irate father. Jimmy joins his crook pals while Billy determines to make good. He wanders into Midvale and gets a job as lineman with the telephone company where he meets Betty and falls in love with her. Jimmy's gang pick out the Midvale bank for a haul. In making a getaway, Jimmy rushes into the telephone building. A fire starts and he is trapped but manages to send a last message to his mother over the phone. The thieves have cut the wires, but Betty stays on the job until Billy repairs the lines and sends an alarm which brings about the capture of the gang. Billy rushes back and rescues her from the flames and, having made good, returns home with his bride-to-be and gets his parents forgiveness.

Cast

Preservation
With no prints of Daughters of the Night located in any film archives, it is a lost film.

References

External links

Lantern slide advert (Wayback Machine)
Poster at gettyimages.com

1924 films
Films directed by Elmer Clifton
Lost American films
American silent feature films
Fox Film films
1924 drama films
Silent American drama films
American black-and-white films
Melodrama films
1924 lost films
Lost drama films
1920s American films
1920s English-language films